Kearson DeWitt is a supervillain appearing in American comic books published by Marvel Comics. The character is usually depicted as an enemy of Iron Man.

Publication history
Kearson DeWitt first appeared in Iron Man Annual #13 (July 1990) and was created by Gene Colan and Len Kaminski.

Fictional character biography
Kearson Z. DeWitt described his father as a brilliant engineer decades ahead of the time. Upon being ignored and ridiculed, Kearson's father died penniless and heartbroken with only designs of unrealized potential. Kearson then suspected that Tony Stark was to blame for stealing his father's designs which were used to build Iron Man's suit. He vowed revenge on Stark and Iron Man unaware that the two are one person.

At the time when Tony was shot in the spine by Kathy Dare resulting in Tony being paralyzed, DeWitt developed the idea to control Tony's nervous system by doing a surgery that would plant a chip in the spine. Through this, he would gain control of Tony's movement. He met with the Marrs twins (Desmond and Phoebe) of the Marrs Corporation who agreed to fund his project. The equipment he set up for the chip required human monitors, causing Kearson to hire people to keep watch. Kearson and his fellow scientists began measuring the results in Tony's body. Professor Clemens told Kearson that they have no way to see through Tony's eyes. Kearson controlled Tony's nervous system, causing Tony to sleep for three days while his assistant Cassandra watches over. When Tony wakes up in San Francisco disoriented, Cassandra informed Kearson of this. Kearson chided Dr. Calvin when he recriminated about having no visual contact once again. When Desmond and Phoebe arrived, Desmond demanded to see physical evidence of the project and hoped that by taking control of Stark while exerting so much might do more harm. Desmond, learning that Stark was successfully being controlled, reasserted power over Kearson, reminding him who was in charge. Phoebe even told Desmond what a worthy opponent that Tony was and allowed Kearson to continue the project. In order to see Stark, Kearson has Tony's security man Cartwright to have all security footage of Stark forwarded to him. His team controlled Tony to walk through Stark Industries when James Rhodes tries to stop this. Kearson through Stark ordered his men to take down Rhodes which results in Tony and James getting into a fight. James manages to land a lucky punch onto Tony causing Kearson's men to lose control when Tony is knocked unconscious. James ended up hiding Tony's body and strapping him down so that Kearson couldn't find Tony on the cameras. Kearson got angry at Dr. Samuelson, Atkins, and his other aides. They then told him that Tony is resisting the chip. After three hours, Kearson's aides were unable to figure out how Tony is resisting the chip. DeWitt threatened them by reminding them what the Marrs twins would do them. When Stark ended up television, Kearson was mad until Matheson pointed out that it might be a trick. Kearson then ordered his men back to their stations. Kearson then views footages of Iron Man on television and wonders what Tony's game plan was. He ordered his men to restore Tony's nervous system to Tony which caused pain to Tony. Rhodes managed to rein Iron Man in as a Marrs Helicopter is watching. Tony then deduced that Mars Corporation is partially responsible for these troubles. Iron Man storms Mars Corporation destroying the equipment responsible and scattering Kearson's men. Kearson donned his own suit of armor as Overlord and attacked Iron Man. Upon realizing that Tony and Iron Man are one person, Kearson once again takes control of Tony's nervous system. While taunting Iron Man, Kearson battered around until Iron Man took off and attacked Kearson from the skies. During an aerial fight, both opponents damaged their flight components like Iron Man's boots and Kearson's jet pack, causing the two to be unable to fly and crash to the ground. They continued fighting until Rhodes dons Iron Man's earlier suit and helps Iron Man defeat Kearson. Upon Kearson's helmet being removed, the building collapsed burying Kearson.

DeWitt turned up alive and using a wheelchair. He forms partnerships with A.I.M. and Professor Power where they began trading and selling armor like the Force Ten armor, the Iron Monger armor, and some of Stark Industries' designs. During this time, Iron Man and War Machine with the help of Darkhawk found out about the armor trading and learned that Professor Power is involved from Savage Steel.

Iron Man recruited the Avengers (consisting of Hawkeye, Living Lightning, Scarlet Witch, Spider-Woman, U.S. Agent and Wonder Man) which were split into two teams: one to attack Professor Power and A.I.M and one to defend Stark Industries. Iron Man assaulted A.I.M. as Kearson attacked with a remote-controlled version of the Overload armor. When Iron Man defeated that one, Kearson unleashed two more armors of Overload while revealing his motives for hating Tony as the battle continued. Iron Man destroyed Overload's other armors with a plasma cannon and Kearson (who was cybernetically connected to the machines) ignored the powerful neural feedback he was receiving and tried to superimpose his entire will over the station's entire arsenal. He temporarily succeeded, but found the feedback too much and caused the base to explode. It is unknown if he survived the explosion or not.

Powers and abilities
Kearson DeWitt controlled a massive suit of armor that he claimed was "virtually indestructible". While none of its arsenal was clearly revealed, the Overload armor seemed to have laser cannons, electric blasts, boot jets, and the ability to put a lot of power behind a swung punch. Kearson later directed similar suits of Overload armor via remote control. Before his seeming death, Kearson temporarily had the ability to control a vast arsenal via a neural link.

In other media
Kearson DeWitt appears in the Iron Man 2 movie tie-in video game, voiced by Doug Boyd. This version is an ex-employee of Stark Industries' Theoretical Weapons Division. Outside of working on the arc reactor prototype, Pepper Potts discovers Kearson was working on the secret Protean project until he was fired when the project and its potential dangers were revealed. As a result, Kearson began working with A.I.M. and forged an alliance with Russian General Valentin Shatalov and the Roxxon Energy Corporation to steal a copy of J.A.R.V.I.S. to advance and run their projects. After S.H.I.E.L.D. uncovers their operations, Kearson deduces his alliance has a spy and, faced with the possibility of losing everything, merged his PROTEAN technology with the J.A.R.V.I.S. copy to create the Ultimo battle suit. With the merge complete, Kearson has his men upgraded with PROTEAN implants and merges himself with Ultimo to become a techno-organic hybrid. Once they learn of what Kearson did, Iron Man, War Machine, and S.H.I.E.L.D. join forces to defeat him.

References

External links
 

Comics characters introduced in 1990
Fictional engineers
Marvel Comics supervillains
Characters created by Gene Colan